The Mudcat Café is an online discussion group and song and tune database, which also includes many other features relating to folk music.

History
The website was founded by Max Spiegel as a Blues-oriented discussion site.  It was named after a Mississippi Delta region catfish, capable of living in muddy waters. The fish is locally known as a Mudcat, which is where the name of the website is derived from. This region was the birthplace of the American Delta Blues style. Mudcat Café later transitioned from a Blues music forum to a Folk music forum. 

The website was founded in October 1996 and incorporated the Digital Tradition song database (started in 1988) after the database lost its original home.  The song database is updated on a regular basis by members ("Mudcatters") and now contains the words to over 9,000 folk songs, many with an accompanying MIDI file and links to further information.

Content
The discussion group (the Forum) is divided into music-related and non-music-related topics:

The music-related section hosts lively discussions on American folk music, British folk music and that of many other cultures, origins and lyrics of songs, folklore and related information. Information is provided and maintained on a large number of folk clubs, folk festivals, music sessions and dances around the world.  Requests for origins, lyrics and chords of songs are answered here. Many performing artists also contribute to the discussions from time to time.
The non-music section contains discussion on everything unrelated to music.

The Links section of the site provides links to "Festivals and Venues", "Instruments", "Lyrics, Sheet Music & Tabs", "Performers and Composers", among other subjects dealing with folk music and blues.  
	
The Mudcat Songbook on the site presents MP3 recordings of songs written and recorded by Mudcatters.

Membership is free and the site is run by volunteers.

Mudgatherings 
Mudcatters in different countries meet up regularly at "mudgatherings".

References

External links
 The Mudcat Café
 English Folk Dance and Song Society website
 The Folkopedia Project
 Cited in We Never Will Forget in Voices, The Journal of New York Folklore

Online music and lyrics databases
Folk music publications
Folk music organizations